Umswai is a village in Amri block of Karbi Anglong district in the Indian state of Assam. Apart from being home to an exclusive tribal culture, Umswai also possesses extraordinary natural beauty. Previously it was known as Lalung Hills/Tiwa Hills during Tiwa Gobha Raja's period.

Geography
Umswai is located at the borders of the states of Assam and Meghalaya in Northeast India. It is known for its scenic beauty and natural environment. It is located at 25.9472°N 92.2404°E.

Etymology
The word Umswai is originally derived from the Austroasiatic language of the Khasi people 'Umswai' which loosely translated means 'Water and Sand' referring to the geography of Umswai Valley.

Educational institutions
 Don Bosco Higher Secondary School, Umswai
 Green Valley Academy, Umswai
 Martha Memorial School, Umswai

References

West Karbi Anglong district
Cities and towns in West Karbi Anglong district